ST11 or variation may refer to:

 Star Trek (film) (2009 film) 11th Star Trek theatrical film
 Stralpes Aéro ST-11, a sailplane
 General Aircraft Monospar ST-11, a model in the "Monospar" series of airplanes from General Aircraft

See also
 11th Street (disambiguation)
 STII (disambiguation)